Zion Lutheran Church is a historic Lutheran church located near Jefferson City, Cole County, Missouri. It was built in 1906, and is a one-story Gothic Revival building constructed of brick with a limestone foundation.  It features a three-story front tower with a spire and a polygonal apse in the rear.

It was listed on the National Register of Historic Places in 2000.

References

Lutheran churches in Missouri
Churches on the National Register of Historic Places in Missouri
Gothic Revival church buildings in Missouri
Churches completed in 1906
Churches in Cole County, Missouri
Buildings and structures in Jefferson City, Missouri
National Register of Historic Places in Cole County, Missouri
1906 establishments in Missouri